Take It Easy Urvashi is a 1996 Indian Tamil-language romantic drama film produced and directed by K. K. Rajsirpy. The film stars Vignesh, Amirtha and Rajeshwari, with Raghuvaran, Kavitha, Jeeva, Charle, King Kong, Mayilsamy, Alex, Shanmugasundaram, Sethu Vinayagam, Kumarimuthu and Pandu playing supporting roles. It was released on 30 December 1996. The song "Urvasi Urvasi" from Kadhalan (1994) inspired the title of the film.

Plot
In Ooty, Subramani is a jobless and carefree youth who spends his time roaming with his three friends, while his widow mother Rukmani works hard to meet the needs of her family. The soft-spoken Amulu who lives in his house and Paappa who is from Palakkad are in love with Subramani but Subramani falls in love with Urvashi, a modern woman who is from a wealthy family and has studied abroad. One day, Subramani reveals his love for Urvashi but she refuses to accept it. After many quarrels with Subramani, Urvashi finally accepts Subramani's love. Thereafter, Urvashi's father Jaya who worked abroad returns to his home in Ooty. He first doesn't want his daughter to marry a wastrel but later, Urvashi convinces him and Jaya accepts. When Jaya and Rukmani meet for the marriage arrangement, they categorically refuse to marry them. Jaya is none other than Rukmani's brother and Rukmani tells Subramani about her bitter past.

In the past, Jaya lived with his sister Rukmani, his brother-in-law and Lakshmi. Jaya wanted to work overseas at any cost so he promised his family that he will help them when he will work abroad and he will then marry Lakshmi. His brother-in-law resigned from his teaching job to get the resignation money and his sister sold all her jewels. Jaya eventually went to Dubai and he swore that he will never come back to India. Afterwards, they came to know that Jaya had betrayed them so Lakshmi committed suicide, Rukmani's husband died of heart attack and Rukmani and the young Subramani found themselves on the street. Amulu's parents decided to help to them and after the death of Amulu's parents, Amulu lived with Rukmani and Subramani.

Back to the present, Amulu doesn't want to bother Subramani anymore so she becomes a religious sister. The film ends with Subramani and Urvashi getting married.

Cast

Vignesh as Subramani
Amirtha as Urvashi
Rajeshwari as Amulu
Raghuvaran a Jaya
Kavitha as Rukmani, Subramani's mother
Jeeva as Palakkad Paappa
Charle as Subramani's friend
King Kong as Subramani's friend
Mayilsamy as Subramani's friend
Alex as Urvashi's servant
Shanmugasundaram as Subramani's father
Sethu Vinayagam as Church father
Kumarimuthu as Constable
Pandu as Sub-inspector
Master Arunan
Vellai Subbaiah
Bayilvan Ranganathan as Horse owner
Marthandan as Constable
Vijayamurugan
Karna
Vasu
Venky

Soundtrack
The film score and the soundtrack were composed by Soundaryan.

References

External links 
 

1990s Tamil-language films
1996 films
1996 romantic drama films
Indian romantic drama films